Azad may refer to:

People

Mononym
 Azad (fl. 345), a eunuch and a companion in martyrdom of Simeon Barsabae
 Azad (Maoist) (1952–2010), alias Cherukuri Rajkumar, Spokesperson and Central Politburo member of the Communist Party of India
 Azad (rapper) (born 1974), German rapper of Iranian-Kurdish descent (formerly a member of Asiatic Warriors)

Given name
 Azad Khan Afghan (died 1781), Pashtun military leader
 Azad Ali, British Islamist
 Azad Zaman (died 2021), Bengali politician in Meghalaya

Surname
 Afshan Azad (born 1989), actress who played the character of Padma Patil in the Harry Potter films
 Chandra Shekhar Azad (1906–1931), Indian freedom-fighter
 Chandrashekhar Azad (social activist) (born 1986), Indian activist
 Humayun Azad (1947–2004), Bangladeshi author and scholar
 Mahmoud Mosharraf Azad Tehrani (1934–2006), Iranian poet
 Maulana Abul Kalam Azad (1888–1958), Indian freedom-fighter
 Muhammad Husain Azad (1830–1910), Indian poet
 Ghulam Nabi Azad (born 1949), Indian politician associated with Congress party
 Kavi Kumar Azad (1972–2018), Indian actor famous for Taarak Mehta Ka Ooltah Chashmah TV series
 Saba Azad, Indian actress and musician

Places
 Azad, Afghanistan
 Azat, Armenia
 Azad, Goranboy, Azerbaijan
 Azad, Goygol, Azerbaijan
 Azad, Sistan and Baluchestan, Iran
 Azad, alternate name of Deh-e Azad, Hirmand, Iran
 Azad, West Azerbaijan, Iran
 Azad-e Olya, Zanjan Province, Iran
 Azad-e Sofla, Zanjan Province, Iran
 Azad Kashmir, disputed autonomous region within the state of Jammu and Kashmir in Pakistan

Entertainment
 Azad (fictional game), a fictional game from the book The Player of Games by Iain M. Banks
 Azadi (album), a 1997 album released by Pakistani rock band, Junoon
 Azad, a fictional region where most of the plot and gameplay of the videogame Prince of Persia: The Sands of Time takes place
 Azad (1940 film), a 1940 Hindi film
 Azad (2000 film), a 2000 Telugu film
 Azad (2017 film), a 2017 Pakistani film

Other uses
 Azadi Tower, a monument in Tehran, Iran
 Azadi Stadium, Iran's national and largest stadium
 The Azad, a Bengali newspaper founded in Kolkata and later became the leading daily in East Bengal
 Azad Hind, collaborationist provisional government of Free India led by Netaji Subhas Chandra Bose during World War II
 Azad Hind Fauj, Indian National Army organised by Netaji Subhas Chandra Bose
 Azad (movie theater), a Bangladeshi movie theater
 Islamic Azad University, a private university system in Iran
 Azad TV News, Hindi language news channel in India

See also
 
 Azaad (disambiguation)
 Azat (disambiguation)
 Azd, an Arabian tribe

Bengali Muslim surnames